Petrovsko-Razumovskaya is a Moscow Metro station in Timiryazevsky District of the Northern Administrative Okrug of Moscow. The station opened on 7 March 1991 as a part of a major northern extension of the Serpukhovsko-Timiryazevskaya Line; the Lyublinsko-Dmitrovskaya Line was extended to terminate there on 16 September 2016.

Petrovsko-Razumovskaya has exits to Dmitrovskoye Highway and also provides transfer to a commuter station of the same name on Leningradsky suburban railway line, which serves destinations to the north-west of Moscow. The daily passenger flow is about 80,000.

On the Serpukhovsko-Timiryazevskaya Line, the station is between Vladykino and Timiryazevskaya stations. On the Lyublinsko–Dmitrovskaya Line, the station is between Okruzhnaya and Fonvizinskaya stations. The extension of the Lyublinsko–Dmitrovskaya Line to the north to Seligerskaya is operational and opened in 22 March 2018. The next station of the Okruzhnaya.

The 2016 extension of the station involved building a second hall and two extra tracks. The alignment allows cross-platform interchange between the two lines.

References

Moscow Metro stations
Railway stations in Russia opened in 1991
Serpukhovsko-Timiryazevskaya Line
Lyublinsko-Dmitrovskaya Line
Railway stations located underground in Russia